Line 3 is an east-west line of Suzhou Rail Transit. The line is 45.272 kilometers long. The line links the Wuzhong District, Suzhou Industrial Park, and the Suzhou New District.

Line 3 started trial operations from December 6 to December 10, 2019. Official operation started on December 25, 2019.

Stations

Through service
Through service between Line 3 and Line 11 will start in late 2023.

Map

Gallery

References

Suzhou Rail Transit lines
Suzhou Industrial Park
Railway lines opened in 2019